The Lincoln Saltdogs are a professional baseball team based in Lincoln, Nebraska, in the United States. The Saltdogs are in the American Association of Professional Baseball, an official Partner League of Major League Baseball. Since the 2001 season, the Saltdogs have played their home games at Haymarket Park, which they share with the Nebraska Cornhuskers college baseball team.

History
The Saltdogs were formed when the Madison Black Wolf were sold and moved to Lincoln after the 2000 season. The team was a member of the Northern League from 2001 to 2005. After the 2005 season, the Saltdogs (along with the St. Paul Saints, Sioux City Explorers, and Sioux Falls Canaries) left the Northern League to form the American Association.

The Saltdogs claimed their first league title in 2009, winning the American Association championship. Their overall regular-season record was 49–47, but Lincoln went 27–21 to claim the second-half North Division title and advanced to the championship by defeating the first-half North Division champion Wichita Wingnuts in the division series, three games to two.  The Saltdogs then claimed the title by defeating the South Division champion Pensacola Pelicans three games to two, with game five decided by a 2–1 score at Pelican Park in Pensacola.

Lincoln celebrated its 10th anniversary in 2010, and the team secured its fourth berth in the playoffs over the prior five seasons. The Saltdogs finished with a 51–45 overall record, the seventh time in ten years Lincoln reached the 50-win plateau, and the ninth time in ten seasons that the team finished above the .500 mark. Although the Saltdogs did not win a division title in 2010, their overall record was still good enough for them to qualify for the postseason via a wild card berth. Lincoln has earned four wild-card playoff berths in its history, with the first three (2001, 2002, and 2005) coming during the team's Northern League days.

The Saltdogs made the playoffs in each of their first two years in the American Association. In both 2006 and 2007, they finished with the league's best overall regular-season record, winning three of the four North Division titles (both the first-half and second-half titles in 2006, and the first-half title in 2007). Their 14-game winning streak in 2007 is the longest in team history. The Saltdogs had the best overall record (272–204) of any team in the first five years of the American Association.

Kash Beauchamp was the first manager in Saltdogs history, although his tenure lasted just 42 games into the 2001 season, during which the team went 21–21 (.500). Pitcher Les Lancaster replaced Beauchamp, guiding Lincoln to playoff berths in both 2001 and 2002. Lancaster served as a player-manager for the first ten days of his managing tenure before moving exclusively to the bench. He led the team to a regular-season record of 86–53 (.619) and a postseason record of 6–7. After the 2002 season, Lancaster departed and was replaced by former Toronto Blue Jays manager Tim Johnson. Johnson spent six seasons with the Saltdogs, compiling a 314–252 (.555) regular-season record and a 2–9 postseason record. Lincoln made the playoffs three times under Johnson (2005, 2006, and 2007) and won three division championships (American Association 2006 first-half and second-half North Division titles, 2007 first-half North Division title). Johnson resigned as manager at the end of the 2008 season, and was replaced by Marty Scott, who had managed the Triple-A New Orleans Zephyrs during the 2008 season. Scott won two championships between 1995 and 2000 as the manager of the St. Paul Saints and guided Lincoln to the 2009 championship, his fourth overall as a manager. Over two seasons in Lincoln, Scott compiled a 100–92 (.521) regular-season record and a 6–7 postseason record.  Brett Jodie became the ninth Saltdogs manager in franchise history after the club announced his hiring in April of 2021. Jodie filled the vacancy left by James Frisbie after he was hired to join the Detroit Tigers.  

In 2020, the league announced that the Saltdogs were not selected as one of six teams to participate in a condensed season as a result of the COVID-19 pandemic. They went on hiatus for the season, then returned to play in 2021 when they celebrated their 20th Season.

Roster

Notable alumni
 Kash Beauchamp (2001)
 Les Lancaster (2001)
 Kevin Mitchell (2001)
 Clayton Andrews (2003)
 Bubba Carpenter (2003)
 Mike Figga (2003)
 Francisco Matos (2003)
 Kevin Roberson (2003)
 Pete Rose Jr. (2004)
 Rodney Myers (2005)
 Luis Lopez (2006)
 Chris Jakubauskas (2007)
 Dan Reichert (2007)
 Dusty Bergman (2008)
 Félix José (2008)
 Kit Pellow (2008)
 Carlos Guevara (2009)
 Chris Britton (2010)
 Ángel Castro (2010)
 Blake Gailen (2011)
 Alex Maestri (2011)
 Tim Adleman (2012)
 D'Angelo Jiménez (2012)
 Mike Burns (2013)
 Joe Bisenius (2013-2014)
 Evan Reed (2016)
 Casey Crosby (2017)
 Tommy Mendonca (2017)
 Dashenko Ricardo (2017-2018)
 Tyler Herron (2018)
 Dan Johnson (2018)
 Joey Wagman (2018)
 Shairon Martis (2015-2019)
 Randolph Oduber (2017-2019)
 Vicente Campos (2019)
 José Ortega (2019)
 Nick Tepesch (2019)
 Curt Smith (2011, 2013, 2015-2019, 2021)
 Johnny Barbato (2021)
 David Vidal (2021)

Season-by-season records

Northern League

American Association

References

 aabfan.com - yearly league standings and awards (American Association)
 nlfan.com - yearly league standings and awards (Northern League)

External links
Lincoln Saltdogs official website
nlfan.com Lincoln Saltdogs' Guide (Northern League 2001–2005)
aabfan.com Lincoln Saltdogs' Guide (American Association 2006–present)
nlfan.com Madison Black Wolf Guide

American Association of Professional Baseball teams
Northern League (baseball, 1993–2010) teams
Sports in Lincoln, Nebraska
Professional baseball teams in Nebraska
2001 establishments in Nebraska